On October 2, 2022, Officer James Brennand of the San Antonio Police Department (SAPD) shot 17-year-old Erik Cantu in the parking lot of a McDonald's restaurant in San Antonio, Texas. After responding to an unrelated disturbance, Brennand saw Cantu eating a hamburger in his vehicle, and recognized the vehicle as the same one which had evaded him at a traffic stop the day prior. After opening Cantu's driver-side door, Brennand opened fire when Cantu reversed the vehicle and the same door struck Brennand. Brennand was fired less than a week later and was later charged with two counts of aggravated assault by a peace officer. He was later indicted for aggravated assault and attempted murder. Following the incident, Cantu was immediately placed on life support and remained hospitalized for a number of weeks.

Background 
Brennand was a probationary officer who had been with the SAPD for seven months prior to the shooting. The day prior to the shooting, Cantu had evaded police in the same maroon vehicle, with license plates that were not registered to it. Whether or not Cantu was the same individual from the incident the day before was initially unclear, with some media outlets reporting that Cantu was not the same individual. For example, ABC News reported that officer Brennand had "confus[ed] him and his car with someone who fled from an attempted stop the night before." The San Antonio Current later reported that Cantu apparently was the same individual, based on police records of an interview with Cantu's girlfriend. Cantu's girlfriend was in the car with him during both incidents, and the first incident left her hesitant to get in the car with him again for fear that Cantu's actions might get them arrested or "shot at," she stated in that interview.

Shooting 
Around 10:45 PM on October 2, Officer Brennand responded to the McDonald's on Blanco Road in San Antonio for an unrelated disturbance call. As he questioned witnesses, Brennand noticed Cantu's vehicle, which had evaded him the day before. The vehicle had license plates registered to another vehicle, making Brennand think it was stolen. After Brennand called for backup, he approached the vehicle, opened the driver-side door, and ordered Cantu to exit. As Cantu reversed his vehicle, the open door hit Brennand, who fired five times. He then fired five more times as the vehicle drove away. A passenger sitting in the vehicle was uninjured. Police later stated that while the vehicle had license plates registered to another vehicle, it was not stolen.

Cantu was rendered unconscious and put on life support as a result of the shooting. An attorney for the family said that, "any reports that Cantu is stable or is 'going to be fine' are not true." On October 25, 2022, the family gave a press conference, where they stated that Cantu had developed pneumonia. In addition, the family stated that three of the bullets had been removed, but not a fourth, located near his heart. Cantu's father stated that his condition was "touch and go." On November 7, Cantu's family stated he was weaned off life support and was placed on high-flow oxygen via a tracheostomy. On November 22, Cantu was released from the hospital and returned home.

Reaction 
The Party for Socialism and Liberation and ACT 4 SA held a protest on October 11 outside the SAPD headquarters.

Cantu's family hired civil rights lawyer Ben Crump. Cantu's girlfriend also hired Crump.

Investigation and charges 
Two days after the shooting, Brennand was fired. A spokesperson for the SAPD said Brennand violated his training and police procedures, citing how he approached the vehicle before backup arrived. On October 11, Brennand was charged with two counts of aggravated assault by a peace officer, one count for Cantu and another for the uninjured passenger. SAPD Police Chief William McManus stated that if Cantu died, the charges could have been upgraded to homicide. Brennand was released on a $200,000 bail. His pre-hearing was set for November 23, 2022. He was later indicted by a grand jury for aggravated assault and attempted murder.

Cantu was initially charged with evading detention in a vehicle and assault on a peace officer, but Bexar County District Attorney Joe Gonzales later announced the charges would be dismissed "...out of compassion because the teen is in critical condition in the hospital."

References 

2022 controversies in the United States
2022 in Texas
October 2022 events in the United States
History of McDonald's
History of San Antonio
Law enforcement controversies in the United States
Law enforcement in Texas
Police brutality in the United States
Incidents of violence against boys